Martha Carol Anderson is research scientist with the United States Department of Agriculture. She is known for her work in using satellite imagery to track droughts and their impact on crops. In 2022, she was elected a fellow of the American Geophysical Union.

Education and career 
Anderson has a B.A. from Carleton College (1987) and she earned her Ph.D. from the University of Minnesota in 1993. Following her Ph.D., she move to the University of Wisconsin-Madison where she worked first as a postdoctoral researcher, and then as an associate researcher and assistant scientist. In 2005, she moved to the Agricultural Research Service as a research physical scientist.

Research 
Anderson's Ph.D. research was in the field of observational astrophysics where she investigated supernovas. She then changed her research focus to the interactions between soils, plants, and the atmosphere and how this is detected using remote sensing. She uses data from satellites to develop models that are used to predict droughts and soil moisture stress, and the subsequent impacts on crops.

Selected publications

Awards and honors 
In 2022, Anderson was elected a fellow of the American Geophysical Union. In 2022, she also received the John Dalton medal from the European Geosciences Union in recognition of her work on "multi-scale thermal remote sensing to evapotranspiration and drought impact assessments".

References

External links 

 

Living people
Carleton College alumni
University of Minnesota alumni
Remote sensing professionals
Hydrologists
United States Department of Agriculture people
Year of birth missing (living people)